Charles Raymond Smith (1798–1888)  was a 19th century British sculptor.

Life

He was born in Marylebone in London the son of James Smith, a sculptor of some renown. Charles won the Silver Isis Medal from the Society of Arts in 1817 and their Gold Isis Medal in 1821 for a group of two figures. He attended the Royal Academy Schools from 1816 and won a Silver Medal in 1821 and the Large Gold Medal (their main prize) in 1822 for "The Fight for the Body of Patroclus".

He obtained a post as assistant to William Tollemache prior to working for J P P Kendrick.

He exhibited at the Royal Academy from 1820 to 1840 and at the British Institution from 1829 to 1833.

He died at 246 Marylebone Road on 15 April 1888.

Works
Bust of Mr Ricci (1820)
Statue of Rev Thomas Dunham Whitaker at Whalley, Lancashire (1822)
Monument to Major Sayer at Clare, Suffolk (1823)
Bust of Edward Goldsmith (1827)
Monument to George Holroyd at Reigate (1827)
Monument to James Hudson at Newington-by-Sittingbourne (1827)
Monument to William Williams in Chichester Cathedral (1828)
Monument to Elizabeth Rose in Carshalton (1829)
Monument to the Countess of Clonmell at Marylebone Parish Church (1829)
Bust of Col Dalrymple (1830)
Monument to Mary Walker at Sand Hutton (1830)
Bust of George Campbell of New York (1831)
Statuary at Mamhead Park (the kings and queens of England) for Sir Robert Newman (1838 to 1842)
Tomb of Jacob Britton in Durham Cathedral (1839) 
Statues of Raphael and Michelangelo for Lord Lansdowne at Bowood House (1841)
Bust of Winthrop Praed (1841)
Bust of Rev Thomas Gisborne at Durham University (1841)
Pair of bronze stags and a fountain for Pynes House in Exeter (1852)
St George and the Dragon Fountain at Holkham Hall
Tomb of Grace Darling at Bamburgh churchyard

Family

He was father to Charles John Thomas Smith who was also a sculptor.

References
 

1798 births
1888 deaths
People from Marylebone
English sculptors